Kenneth Bernard Jackson (August 21, 1963 in Shreveport, Louisiana) is a former Major League Baseball player.

References

External links

1963 births
Living people
Baseball players from Shreveport, Louisiana
Philadelphia Phillies players
Angelina Roadrunners baseball players
Major League Baseball shortstops
African-American baseball players
Helena Phillies players
Maine Guides players
Oklahoma City 89ers players
Peninsula Pilots players
Reading Phillies players
Scranton/Wilkes-Barre Red Barons players
Spartanburg Spinners players
Tulsa Drillers players